Charles Jennings may refer to:

Charles Edward Jennings de Kilmaine (1751–1799), Irish-born French general
Charles Jennings (journalist) (1908–1973), Canadian journalist
C. W. E. Jennings (1877–1949), businessman and state legislator in Oregon, U.S.